Sedloňov is a municipality and village in Rychnov nad Kněžnou District in the Hradec Králové Region of the Czech Republic. It has about 200 inhabitants.

Administrative parts
The village of Polom is an administrative part of Sedloňov.

References

Villages in Rychnov nad Kněžnou District